Vyshonn King Miller (born June 18, 1975), better known by his stage name Silkk the Shocker, is an American rapper and actor. He originally went under the stage name Silkk, but later adopted  Silkk the Shocker after the release of his first album. He has now signed partnership with his brother Master P and his nephew Romeo label No Limit Forever.

Music career

1996–1998: The Shocker and Charge It 2 Da Game
Silkk the Shocker rose to fame in the mid-late 1990s. After striking a deal with Priority, No Limit Records released Silkk's debut album The Shocker in August 1996, produced by Beats By The Pound, DJ Daryl, K-Lou and T-Bone. After changing his name to Silkk the Shocker, he went on to appear on numerous albums from TRU's Tru 2 da Game, Mia X's Unlady Like, and Mystikal's Unpredictable. He used the Shocker alias on a few No Limit albums in 1997. Silkk would appear on Master P's 1997 hit "Make 'Em Say Uhh!" which is featured on Master P's 1997 album Ghetto D, which became a massive hit in the US. Continuing on the success of the hit single, Silkk would release his next single with labelmate Mystikal called "It Ain't My Fault". It Ain't My Fault gained popularity and became one of the trademark songs for Silkk the Shocker. He released another single, "Just Be Straight with Me", featuring Destiny's Child. The same year Silkk was featured on the hit single "Movin' On", a song from Mya's self-titled debut album Mýa. Charge It 2 Da Game became a big success over time, staying on the Billboard album charts for over a year. It was certified platinum after a few months.

1999: Made Man
His second solo album was released in January 1999. The singles It Ain't My Fault 2 (feat. Mystikal) and Somebody Like Me (feat. Mya) were regularly played on MTV and BET and became two of Silkk's biggest ever hits. Despite selling over a million copies, it failed to garner critical success and acclaim due to fans and critics becoming tired of the typical No Limit tropes and sound around this time.

2001–2004: My World, My Way and Based on a True Story
In 2001, Silkk released My World, My Way. He dropped the singles "That's Cool"  featuring Trina and "He Did That" feat. Mac, which made it to #13 on the Hot R&B/Hip Hop Singles and Tracks. Based on a True Story, which was released in 2004 on New No Limit/Koch Records, didn't' garner much popularity.

2010–present: Incredible 
On June 3, 2010, a video of Silkk freestyling over DJ Khaled's "All I Do Is Win" was posted to YouTube. Silkk released his first mixtape called All I Do Is Win on August 21, 2010, the mixtape marks Silkk's return to hip-hop. It was confirmed that Silkk signed with his nephew Romeo's new record label, No Limit Forever Records, and is working on his sixth  studio album called Incredible. Some of the producers on this album are Manny Streetz, Marvz, Mike Bangum of Da Beat Kadetz and JoJo Ryder. In 2010 Silkk the Shocker went on a tour with his brother Master P and nephew Romeo Miller. The tour was entitled "No Limit Forever International".

On November 5, 2013, Silkk announced on his Twitter account that he was still working on his upcoming sixth studio album Incredible. On April 24, 2014, Silkk released the first single off Incredible entitled "Don't Give Up". On May 15, 2014, Silkk released a music video on his Vevo channel for "Don't Give Up". On May 19, 2014, Miller would release the second single off Incredible entitled "We Ain't Even Trippin".
 
On March 2, 2015, Silkk announced via his official YouTube channel that his new single entitled "Business" featuring No Limit Forever in-house producer BlaqNmilD would be released later in March and his album Incredible would be released later the same year along with a movie of the same name starring himself. On August 24, 2015, Miller would release the music video for his second single entitled "We Ain't Even Trippin"; it would be directed by T. Church. On September 4, 2015, Miller would release the third single off Incredible entitled "Business" featuring No Limit Forever in-house producer BlaqNmilD.

Other ventures
Silkk was featured on World Wrestling Entertainment's WWE Wreckless Intent album, which was released on May 23, 2006. The song he performed on the album, "I'm Comin'", has since been used as the theme song for WWE Smackdown wrestler Montel Vontavious Porter until his release in late 2010. Silkk also performed former SmackDown! wrestler Orlando Jordan's theme song "Do It Big".

Acting career
In 1999, Silkk acted as the lead role in the major No Limit Records film Hot Boyz.

In 2007, Silkk, along with comedians Lil Duval and Michael Blackson, was cast as the lead actors in the Six Five film More Money, More Family; the film was produced by Silkk the Shocker and Tracy McGrady and shot on location in Orange, California, using film students from nearby Chapman University, originally intended for DVD release in Wal-Mart, but the film has yet to find a distributor. On October 2, 2015, Silkk would announce via his Instagram that film production companies Grindstone Entertainment and Lionsgate Films would be distributing the movie More Money, More Problems, and its release date would be November 3, 2015.

In 2011, Silkk co-starred in the horror film Reservation produced by Sedona Studios.

Personal life

Family
Silkk is the younger cousin of Mo B. Dick. His older brother, Kevin Miller, was killed during a robbery in 1990. Rappers C-Murder and Master P are also his older brothers. He has three children, two sons and a daughter. He is married to Junalyn "JuJu" Pattugalan, who is also the sister of Cymphonique Miller's mother.

Discography

Studio albums
 The Shocker (1996)
 Charge It 2 da Game (1998)
 Made Man (1999)
 My World, My Way (2001)
 Based on a True Story (2004)
 It Will All Make Sense Later (2018)

Filmography

Films

References

External links

 

1975 births
Living people
20th-century American male musicians
21st-century American male musicians
21st-century American rappers
African-American male rappers
American male rappers
Gangsta rappers
MNRK Music Group artists
No Limit Records artists
Priority Records artists
Rappers from New Orleans